The Office of the Chief Human Resources Officer (formerly Canada Public Service Agency) is the representative of the Government of Canada on all issues relating to human resources, pensions and benefits, labour relations and compensation.

Organization
The office is headed by the Chief Human Resources Officer (currently Christine Donohue), who has similar status as the Comptroller General of Canada - while housed under the Treasury Board Secretariat, its operation is independently carried out by the CHRO and not by TBS staff. She is responsible for providing strategic enterprise-wide leadership. CHRO is also the ex officio Chair of the Board of Governors for the Canada School of Public Service.

History
In a strategic review conducted by the Harper government in early 2008, it was determined HR activities can be more efficiently and effectively managed by centralizing all functions into one agency. Prior to March 2, 2009, human resources responsibility for the federal government was split between two agencies: the Canada Public Service Agency and the Treasury Board Secretariat.

References

External links
 Office of the Chief Human Resources Officer

Federal departments and agencies of Canada
Canada